Etzikom Coulee is a coulee located in Southern Alberta, Canada. 

The waterway was formed as a glacial spillway channel at the end of the last ice age.

Course
The Etzikom Coulee begins northeast of the town of Stirling, and makes its way southeast of the Hamlet of Wrentham, after that it passes by the Hamlet of Skiff into the Crow Indian Lake, then southeast of the Village of Foremost as well as the Hamlet of Nemiskam, and finally ending south of the Hamlet of Etzikom at Pakowki Lake, the largest lake in Southern Alberta.

See also

 List of coulees in Alberta
 List of lakes in Alberta

References

Coulees of Alberta
County of Forty Mile No. 8
County of Warner No. 5